Wilcza is the name of a street in Warsaw.

Wilcza may also refer to the following villages in Poland:
Wilcza, Lower Silesian Voivodeship (south-west Poland)
Wilcza, Silesian Voivodeship (south Poland)
Wilcza, Greater Poland Voivodeship (west-central Poland)